Otilia is a feminine given name. Notable people with the name include:

 Otilia Bădescu (born 1970), Romanian table tennis player
 Otilia Cazimir (1894–1967), Romanian poet
 Otilia Larrañaga, Mexican dancer and actress
 Otilia Lux, Guatemalan social leader
 Otilia Pasarica (born 1968), Romanian volleyball player
 Otilia Ruicu-Eșanu (born 1978), Romanian track and field athlete

See also
 Plácido Otilia family, Mexican family which specializes in the making of traditional musical instruments

Romanian feminine given names